is an LNG-fired thermal power station operated by Tohoku Electric in the town of Shichigahama, Miyagi, Japan. The facility is located on Matsushima Bay along the Pacific coast of Honshu.

History
The Sendai Thermal Power Station was built in 1959 to supply power to the Sendai metropolis and surrounding Miyagi Prefecture. Unit 1 came online in October 1959. Unit 2 was completed in November 1960 and Unit 3 in June 1962. Initially, all three units burned coal; however, Unit 1 was subsequently modified to burn heavy oil instead. 

Unit 3 was abolished in March 2004 and Units 1 and 2 in August 2007, and replaced by the single combined cycle Unit 4, in order to reduce carbon emissions and lower operating costs, which came on line in July 2010.

Operations were temporarily suspended due to damage caused by the Tōhoku earthquake and tsunami in March 2011, but test operations were resumed on December 20 and full output was restored by February 8, 2012.  From April 1, 2017, the rated output of Unit 4 was upgraded from 446,000 kW to 468,000 kW due to operational experience and software modifications.

The site of Units 1, 2 and 3 are now occupied by the 2 MW capacity Sendai Solar Power Plant, which started operation on May 25, 2012.

Plant details

See also 

 Energy in Japan
 List of power stations in Japan

External links
Tohoku Electric list of major power stations

1959 establishments in Japan
Natural gas-fired power stations in Japan
Shichigahama, Miyagi
Energy infrastructure completed in 1959
Buildings and structures in Miyagi Prefecture